is a song by Japanese singer/songwriter Chisato Moritaka, from her 1990 studio album Kokon Tozai. The lyrics were written by Moritaka and the music was composed by Hideo Saitō. The "Home Version" of the song was released as the double A-side of Moritaka's 1991 single "Benkyō no Uta". The song was used in a Glico Pocky commercial featuring Moritaka.

Background 
Moritaka wrote the song as an homage to her home town of Kumamoto; hence the use of the Kumamoto dialect in the lyrics. During her 1998 Sava Sava tour, Moritaka explained that Tomari River is a reference to Tomari, Hokkaido, the hometown of songwriter and collaborator Yuichi Takahashi.

The song introduced the "Kono Machi wave", with Moritaka directing the audience to raise their right arms in a clockwise motion with their index fingers pointing upwards before waving them left to right. During the Kumamoto show of the Kono Machi Tour 2019, Kumamon made a guest appearance to do the "Kono Machi wave" with the crowd.

Other versions 
Aside from the album and Home Version mixes, a third version was included in the 1991 remix album The Moritaka.

Moritaka re-recorded the song and uploaded the video on her YouTube channel on November 1, 2013. This version is also included in Moritaka's 2014 self-covers DVD album Love Vol. 6.

Cute version 

The Japanese female idol group Cute released their cover of "Kono Machi" as their 20th major single on February 6, 2013.

Background 
The single was released in five versions: Regular Edition and Limited Editions A, B, C, and D. The Regular Edition and the limited edition B and D are CD-only. The limited editions A and C include a DVD and feature covers of other Moritaka songs. All the limited editions were shipped sealed and included a serial-numbered entry card for the lottery to win a ticket to one of the single's launch events.

Track listing 
All lyrics are written by Chisato Moritaka.

Regular Edition

Limited Editions A, B

Limited Editions C, D

Bonus 
Sealed into all the limited editions:
 Event ticket lottery card with a serial number

Charts 

* First week sales according to Oricon: 24,361 copies

References

External links 
Chisato Moritaka
 

Cute
 
 Special site dedicated to the release of the single "Kono Machi"
 Profile on the Hello! Project official website
 Profile on the Up-Front Works official website

1990 songs
2013 singles
Japanese-language songs
Chisato Moritaka songs
Cute (Japanese idol group) songs
Song recordings produced by Tsunku
Songs with lyrics by Chisato Moritaka
Songs with music by Hideo Saitō (musician, born 1958)
Warner Music Japan singles
Zetima Records singles